The 2003 TAC Cup season was the 12th season of the TAC Cup competition. Calder Cannons have won there 2nd premiership title after defeating the Murray Bushrangers in the grand final by 92 points.

Ladder

Grand Final

References 

NAB League
Nab League